Warren Cameron Westhead (born 1977) is a former Canadian politician and operating room nurse who served one term in the Legislative Assembly of Alberta, representing the electoral district of Banff-Cochrane. He was elected as the 2nd Vice-President of United Nurses of Alberta in October, 2019, where he currently serves.

Electoral history

2019 general election

2015 general election

References

1970s births
Alberta New Democratic Party MLAs
Canadian nurses
Living people
Nipissing University alumni
People from Oshawa
University of Toronto alumni
21st-century Canadian politicians
Male nurses